A skyline is the artificial horizon that a city's overall structure creates.

Skyline or variation, may also refer to:

Geography

United States 
 Skyline, Alabama
 Skyline, Minnesota
 Skyline, Tacoma, Washington
 Skyline, West Virginia
 Skyline Boulevard, a scenic highway in California
 Skyline Caverns, Virginia
 Skyline Drive, Shenandoah National Park, Virginia
 Skyline Ski Area, former name (1949–79) of Pebble Creek, Idaho, a ski area in southeastern Idaho

Elsewhere 
 Skyline, Honiara, Solomon Islands
 Skyline, Ottawa, Canada, a neighbourhood
 Skyline (London), residential tower in London.

Arts and media

Film
 Skyline (1931 film) 
 Skyline (2010 film), a 2010 science fiction film directed by the Brothers Strause

Journalism
 Skyline (newspaper), a Chicago newspaper
 "Sky Line" (column), a column in The New Yorker written by Paul Goldberger

Music 
 Skyline (band), a "new grass" group headed by Tony Trischka
 Skyline (Steve Howe album), 2002
 Skyline (Yann Tiersen album), 2011
 Skyline (Gonzalo Rubalcaba album), 2021
 "Skyline", a song by Amaranthe from their 2014 album Massive Addictive
 "Skyline", a song by Erra from their 2016 album Drift
 "Skyline", a song by Broken Social Scene from their 2017 album Hug of Thunder
 "Sky Line", a song by Up10tion from the 2021 album Connection (Up10tion album)
 "Skyline", a 2022 song by Khalid.

Businesses
 Skyline (Nigeria), a passenger airline in Nigeria
 Skyline (Sweden), a defunct airline
 Sky Line for Air Services, an airline; see List of airline codes (S)
 Skyline Casino, a casino in Henderson, Nevada
 Skyline Chili, a restaurant chain based in Cincinnati, Ohio
 Skyline SL-222, a Ukrainian-made helicopter
 Skyline Solar, a solar power company in California
 Skyline Queenstown, a tourism operation in Queenstown, New Zealand

Schools
 Skyline College, California, USA
 Skyline High School (disambiguation), several high schools
 Skyline University College (Sharjah), United Arab Emirates

Other uses
 Skyline (construction set), a toy sold in the late 1950s and early 1960s
 Skyline (emulator), a Nintendo Switch emulator for Android devices
 Skyline (horse) (born 1955), an Australian Thoroughbred racehorse
 Nissan Skyline, an automobile manufactured first by Prince Motors, and later the Nissan Motor Company
 Skyline Conference, a college athletic conference based in the New York City area that competes in the NCAA's Division III
 Skyline logging, in forestry, a method of cable logging
 Skyline matrix, a form of a matrix storage
 Skyline operator, a data query selecting the potential best data points
 Skyline (software), a software for analysis of mass spectrometric data
 SkyLine, people mover in Frankfurt Airport

See also 

 Skylines (disambiguation)
 Skyliner (disambiguation)
 Skyliners (disambiguation)